The 1993 Summer Deaflympics, officially known as the 17th Summer Deaflympics is an international multi-sport event that was held from 24 July 1993 to 2 August 1993. The event was hosted by Sofia, Bulgaria.

It was the first Deaflympic event in which more than 50 nations participated. The Summer Games included 14 different disciplines.

Sofia was selected to host the Deaflympic event for the first time and after 20 years, the city went on to host the Summer Deaflympics competition in 2013. In fact, Sofia became only the second city in the world to have hosted the Summer Deaflympics event twice after Copenhagen.

Medal Tally

References 

1993 in multi-sport events
1993 in Bulgarian sport
July 1993 sports events in Europe
August 1993 sports events in Europe
International sports competitions hosted by Bulgaria
1990s in Sofia
Sports competitions in Sofia
Parasports in Bulgaria
Multi-sport events in Bulgaria
Deaflympics